Esanatham is a village in Tamil Nadu, India. It is part of Karur District and surrounded by villages of the Dindigul district.

Nearest towns and cities
Dindigul - 47 km
Karur - 36 km
Trichy - 94 km
Madurai - 111 km
Coimbatore - 139 km

Demographics

According to the latest 2020 Indian census, Esanatham has a population of 10056 consisting of 2023 families. The male population is 6089 and the female population is 3967 with 9.81% of the population under five years of age. The literacy rate is 75.12%, which is lower than the state average of 80.09%. Literacy stands at 86.31% for men and 64.55% for women. The sex ratio is 1040 which is comparable to the state ratio of 996. 

15.44% of the population are members of a Scheduled Caste (SC).

Work Profile

2708 residents of Esanatham are engaged in work activities.

References

Villages in Karur district